Petrovice is a village and municipality in Bytča District in the Žilina Region of northern Slovakia.

History
In historical records the village was first mentioned in 1312.

Geography

Villages and municipalities in Bytča District